Philippe Sanchez (born 26 September 1969) is a former French cross-country skier who competed from as a senior competitor 1992 to 1998. Competing in three Winter Olympics, his best overall finish was eighth in the 4 x 10 km relay at Albertville in 1992 while his best individual finish was 29th in the 10 km + 15 km combined pursuit at Lillehammer in 1994.

Sanchez's best finish at the FIS Nordic World Ski Championships was 33rd in the 50 km event at Thunder Bay, Ontario in 1995. His best World Cup finish was 15th in the 15 km event in Italy in 1994.

Sanchez has three individual victories in lesser events all at 15 km from 1995 to 1996, including European Championship.

At the end of his career, Sanchez become trainer, helping the young competitors of his home mountains to progress.

Nowadays, he lives near Bordeaux, and became a knifemaker in creating "VAGALAMES coutellerie".

External links

Olympic 4 x 10 km relay results: 1936-2002 

1969 births
Living people
Cross-country skiers at the 1992 Winter Olympics
Cross-country skiers at the 1994 Winter Olympics
Cross-country skiers at the 1998 Winter Olympics
Olympic cross-country skiers of France
French male cross-country skiers
20th-century French people
21st-century French people